Burgh Castle is a village and civil parish in the English county of Norfolk. The parish was part of Suffolk until 1974.

History
Burgh Castle's name is of Roman origin and derives from Gariannonum which invokes the Latin name for the River Yare.

Burgh Castle was likely the site of a Neolithic settlement due to an abundance of flint and bronze axe-heads being discovered in the area.

Burgh Castle is the location of a Roman Fortification which dates to the third century; the fort was part of system of coastal defence, the Saxon Shore, against Anglo-Saxon incursions on the East Anglian coast. The site is maintained by the Norfolk Archeological Trust and is open free of charge to the public.

It has been suggested by the Elizabethan historian William Camden, that Burgh Castle is the site of Cnobheresburg, the first Irish monastery in southern England founded by Saint Fursey in the seventh century as part of the Hiberno-Scottish mission.

In the Domesday Book of 1086, Burgh Castle is recorded as consisting of 15 households, belonging to 'Ralph the Bowman.'

St. Peter and St. Paul's Church
Burgh Castle's Parish Church is of Anglo-Saxon origin and is dedicated to Saint Peter and Saint Paul. The church is one of Norfolk's remaining 124 round-tower churches and the majority of the building dates from the Thirteenth and Fifteenth Centuries, however, there are a significant amount of Roman tiles in the building, likely repurposed from the Roman Fort. It has been a Grade II* listed building since November 1954.

Local government
In the 2001 census, Burgh Castle had a population of 955 people in 376 households. For the purposes of local government, the parish today falls within the district of Great Yarmouth. However prior to the Local Government Act 1972, the parish was within Lothingland Rural District in Suffolk.

References

External links

 Gariannum Roman Fort, Roman-Britain.co.uk
Burgh Castle fort at Norfolk Archaeological Trust
Burgh Castle at genuki.org.uk
Burgh Castle at English Heritage
St Peter's and St Paul's on the European Round Tower Churches Website
Photographs of the church and fort at flickr.com
Hursey Pilgrims - Christian pilgrimage to Burgh Castle

Villages in Norfolk
Castles in Norfolk
Ruins in Norfolk
English Heritage sites in Norfolk
Civil parishes in Norfolk
Kingdom of East Anglia
Borough of Great Yarmouth